The Estadio Los Pinos is a multi-use stadium in Cuautitlán, State of Mexico, Mexico.  It is currently used mostly for football matches and is the home stadium for Real Cuautitlán.  The stadium has a capacity of 5,000 people.

References

External links

Estadio Los Pinos
Athletics (track and field) venues in Mexico